Lasbela University of Agriculture, Water & Marine Sciences (LUAWMS) is a public sector university located in Uthal, in Lasbela District, in Balochistan province of Pakistan.

History 
 March 7, 2005 - Inception of the university. The university was chartered through Ordinance No. 1/2005, Government of Balochistan, Pakistan.
 Mar 30, 2005 - Mr. Shaukat Aziz, former Prime Minister of Pakistan, handed over the premises of Ex Lasbela Textile Mills for the university and announced a grant of Rs.30 million for its expenses.
 Jun 13, 2005 - Work on building started.
 Jun 21, 2005 - The Chief Minister Balochistan, Mir Jam Muhammad Yousuf announced a matching grant of Rs. 30 million. On same day the vacant parts of LTM buildings were taken over from Pakistan Industrial Development Corporation.
 Aug 16, 2005 to date - The Chancellor constituted the Senate of LUAWMS that would be the supreme body entrusted with governing the university. Since the establishment of LUAWMS, four Senate meetings have been convened. The Senate meetings were chaired by Chancellor/Governor Balochistan Owais Ahmed Ghani.
 Nov 30, 2005 - Classes of BS Marine Sciences and DVM were started.
 Mar 06, 2006 - First admissions were made to BS Agriculture, Economics and English.
 Classes in the Faculty of Water Sciences started in September 2007.

Faculties  
 Faculty of Veterinary & Animal Sciences
 Faculty of Agriculture
 Faculty of Engineering Sciences and Technology
 Faculty of Marine Sciences
 Faculty of Management and Social Sciences
 Faculty of Education
 Faculty of Languages and Literature

Undergraduate programs 
 Doctor of Veterinary Medicine (DVM)
 BS Marine Science
 BS Geology
 BS Environment Science
 BS Computer Science
 BS Water Resources Management
 BS Agriculture
 BBA / BSBA
 BS Economics
 BS Sociology
 BS International Relations
 BS Political Science
 BS Islamic Studies
 BS English
 B.Ed (Hons)

Graduate programs 
 MS Marine Biology
 MS Marine Fisheries
 MS Economics
 MS Agriculture
 MS English (Linguistics)
 MS Political Science
 MS Education
 MS Integrated Water Resource Management

Postgraduate Programs 
 PhD Marine Biology
 PhD Economics

References 

Lasbela District
B
Educational institutions established in 2005
2005 establishments in Pakistan
Agricultural universities and colleges in Pakistan